UPIM ("Unico Prezzo Italiano Milano") is an Italian chain of midmarket department stores specialising in clothes for men, women and children, items for the home, and cosmetics and perfumes.
It currently operates 135 directly owned stores and more than 200 franchises, plus 15 stores under the Upim-BluKids brand.
For a long time part of La Rinascente Group, it was acquired by Coin in 2010.

The first store opened in Verona in 1928.
The chain was purchased by the Agnelli family, along with  La Rinascente Group in the 1970s.
In 2007 it became the primary sponsor of the Lega A basketball club Fortitudo Bologna.
In January 2010 the business was acquired by Gruppo Coin, separating from La Rinascente and making the Gruppo Coin, which already owned the Oviesse (OVS Industry) and Coin chains, the largest fashion retailer in the country.

References

External links
 UPIM Official Website
 

Italian brands
Clothing retailers of Italy
Companies based in Milan
Retail companies of Italy
Retail companies established in 1928
Italian companies established in 1928